This article shows the qualification for the 2012 Women's European Water Polo Championship.

Qualification

System

Pre-qualified
 (hosts)
 (winners, 2010 Women's European Water Polo Championship) 
 (finalists, 2010 Women's European Water Polo Championship) 
 (4th place, 2010 Women's European Water Polo Championship)

Group stage

Draw pools

Group A

Group B

See also
 2012 Men's European Water Polo Championship Qualifiers

References

Women
Women's European Water Polo Championship
Euro
Euro